Abraham Bragança de Vasconcellos Weintraub (born 11 October 1971) is a Brazilian economist and investment banker who served as Brazil's Minister of Education from 2019 to 2020. He served as the Executive Director for the World Bank from the 15th district from 2020 to 2022, when he resigned his post in order to run in the 2022 São Paulo gubernatorial election.

Biography
Weintraub was born in São Paulo into a Jewish father, Mauro Weintraub, and a non-Jewish mother, Mariliza Bragança de Vasconcelos, both doctors who studied at Faculty of Medicine of Sorocaba. He is a professor at the Federal University of São Paulo (Unifesp), Master in Administration in Finance for Getúlio Vargas Foundation (FGV), and graduated in Economic Sciences at the University of São Paulo (USP) in 1994.

An executive of the financial market with over 20 years of experience, he acted as the lead economist and director of Banco Votorantim and as a partner in Quest Investimentos. He was a member of the transition team of the government of President Bolsonaro, and was Secretary-Executive of the Chief of Staff Onyx Lorenzoni.

He became a member of Bolsonaro's transition cabinet in November 2018.

Ministry of Education

Entry
On 8 April 2019, Bolsonaro appointed Weintraub as the new Minister of Education, replacing Ricardo Vélez Rodríguez. Weintraub is close to Onyx Lorenzoni, the current Chief of Staff whom he previously served as Executive-Secretary.

Departure
On 18 June 2020, after 14 months in office, Weintraub announced his resignation from the Ministry in a video with Bolsonaro posted on social media. He had been criticized for issuing statements deemed controversial, as well as for mismanagement.

On the night of June 19, before his exoneration was published, Weintraub traveled to the United States. To travel, Weintraub took advantage of the diplomatic passport conceded to ministers, due to the fact that U.S. travel restrictions related to COVID-19 barred civilians from Brazil starting on 29 May. This was cause for controversy, as a request to the Supreme Federal Court for the apprehension of Weintraub's passport had been filed the day before he traveled, motivated by the two open investigations against him.

On 20 June 2020, his resignation from the position of Minister of Education was published on the government's official journal. On 23 June 2020, the resignation date was rectified to be the previous day, 19 June 2020. The government also published a note stating that Weintraub's resignation request was only formally received after he had already left the country, on June 20, and that Weintraub himself requested his resignation be retroactively changed to June 19.

World Bank
In July 2020, Weintraub was elected as an executive director of the World Bank for a term ending on 31 October 2020. Officials from the Bank have criticized Weintraub for propagating false information regarding the COVID-19 pandemic. He resigned in 30 April 2022 in order to run in the 2022 São Paulo gubernatorial election.

Controversies

Racist remarks
After a meeting with President Bolsonaro in March 2020, Weintraub was accused of being racist and anti-minority, when he said he did not like the term "indigenous peoples". However, he claimed that this was as he "does not like to separate ethnic groups, and that for him there is only 'the Brazilian people' and not different groups in Brazil". 

On April 4, 2020, Weintraub also tweeted an anti-Chinese slur, insinuating that China was responsible for the COVID-19 pandemic and that it was part of its "plan for world domination". In the original Portuguese, his tweet substituted the letter "r" with capital "L" – "BLazil" instead of "Brazil" in a style commonly used to mock a Chinese accent. He later claimed that it was not a racial statement but an ideological statement due to his anti-communism.

Accusations regarding drugs in universities 
In November 2019, during an interview with Jornal da Cidade, Weintraub accused federal universities of cultivating cannabis and preparing methamphetamine in chemistry labs, but did not present any evidence to support his claims:

After the fact, 10 state deputies of Bahia presented an interpellation, questioning Weintraub's accusations. The then-minister responded by saying that his declarations were generic and that he had no intention of accusing any specific persons. Weintraub's statements would therefore be considered as an exercise of free speech.

Emmanuel Macron 
In August 2019, Weintraub wrote that the French people had elected a president "devoid of any character" and that Macron is "nothing but a worthless opportunist who seeks support from the French agricultural lobby".

Filming in class 
In April 2019, Weintraub stated that the filming of teachers by students during class is a right held by the latter, calling it an "individual liberty". Responding to the minister's statements, jurists argued that the unauthorized filming of teachers in class may violate the fundamental rights of educators, and is unconstitutional.

Crack conspiracy theory 
In a 2018 interview Weintraub claimed that crack was introduced to Brazil by communists in order to weaken the country. He also said that FARC, a Colombia guerilla movement, had been invited as honored guests to the Foro de São Paulo, an annual gathering of Latin American leftist parties. These comments led The Guardian to brand Weintraub as a conspiracy theorist.

Spelling errors 
On multiple occasions, the then-Minister of Education wrote incorrect or otherwise improper Portuguese, with spelling mistakes or grammatical errors, on official documents and social media. In January 2020, in a tweet to Eduardo Bolsonaro, Weintraub wrote "imprecionante" instead of "impressionante", roughly equivalent to writing "imprecive" instead of "impressive", in English; the tweet was later deleted by Weintraub.

Notes

References

External links

|-

1971 births
Living people
Brazilian people of Jewish descent
People from São Paulo
University of São Paulo alumni
Academic staff of the Federal University of São Paulo
Far-right politics in Brazil
Brazilian anti-communists
Brazilian conspiracy theorists
Education Ministers of Brazil
World Bank people
Party of the Brazilian Woman politicians